The following is the discography of the English symphonic and progressive rock band the Moody Blues.

Albums

Studio albums

Live albums

Compilation albums

Video albums

EPs

Singles

Notes 
A. In 2000 Strange Times and The Very Best of The Moody Blues were re-released as a double set in the UK, reaching No. 19.
B."Nights in White Satin" charted highest in most countries on it's 1972 re-release, except in the Netherlands where the original 1967 release charted higher.

References

External links
 

Discographies of British artists
Rock music group discographies
Discography